The Burns Times-Herald is a weekly newspaper serving the city of Burns, Oregon, and the surrounding Harney County area.

About six newspapers were consolidated over several decades to result in the Times-Herald. The following papers ultimately combined to form the current Times-Herald:
 Harney Valley Items, 1885
 East Oregon Herald, David Louis Grace and Nellie R. Grace, 1887
 Harney County News, Nellie R. Grace, 1894
 Times-Herald, Julian and Charles A. Byrd had in 1891 purchased the Herald, the Harney Times, and the Burns Tribune, 1896
 Burns News absorbed the Harney Valley Items, and competed with the Times-Herald until consolidated with it, 1930.

Early on, coverage was largely agricultural, with articles picked up from nearby Oregon and Idaho papers. The Graces were highly involved in the local community, and retained ownership until 1923.

Julian Byrd managed the paper for 40 years, and was considered instrumental in bringing the telephone, electricity, and movies to the rural city, as well as advocating for railroad lines. The newspaper changed ownership many times from 1930 to 2006, when the paper's journalists bought it, in the state's first staff buyout.

Motto
The paper's motto is "Covers Harney County like the Sagebrush".

References

External links
Burns Times-Herald website

1887 establishments in Oregon
Burns, Oregon
Newspapers published in Oregon
Oregon Newspaper Publishers Association
Publications established in 1887
Weekly newspapers published in the United States